Lycceios, Lycpeios or Lyppeios (Greek: Λύκκειος, Λύκπειος or Λύππειος; ruled 356–340 BC) was an ancient Paeonian king who joined an anti-Macedonian coalition with Grabos II and Thrace in 356 BC. 

He was preceded to the throne by Agis and succeeded by Patraus.

References

Paeonian kings
4th-century BC rulers